Trevor Hall is the sixth album by Trevor Hall (not including his unreleased album The Elephant's Door). The album spawned two singles, "Unity" and "Volume". It is his first major-label release since he was dropped from Geffen Records. The album features two songs that had previously been recorded for his unreleased album The Elephant's Door. "The Lime Tree" and "31 Flavors" were reworked and re-recorded, with "The Lime Tree" featuring additional vocals by Colbie Caillat. The album was produced by Marshall Altman, who also performed on several tracks. After the first week of the album's release, it had debuted at #199 on the Billboard 200 album chart, also debuting at #7 on the Billboard Heatseeker's chart. Trevor was only 22 when the album was released.

The album is dedicated to Sri Baba Neem Karoli Maharajji and Sri Nabani Das Khyepa Baul.

Track listing

Personnel
Trevor Hall - Acoustic guitar, vocals, melodica on "Origami Crane"
Sean Hurley - Bass guitar
Izler - Electric guitar
Michael Chaves - Electric guitar
Aaron Sterling - Drums, percussion, live drum programming
Zac Rae - Wurlitzer, clavinet, piano, keys, synthesizer, noises, live drum programming on "Origami Crane", banjo on "My Baba", electric guitar on "Sing the Song"
Chris Steele - Percussion
Matisyahu - Vocals on "Unity"
Colbie Caillat - Vocals on "The Lime Tree"
Krishna Das - Vocals on "My Baba"
Becky Gebhardt - Sitar on "Internal Heights"
Alex Altman - Mini-guitar on "Internal Heights"
Eric Robinson - Hammond organ on "Unity", wurlitzer on "The Lime Tree", backing vocals on "Volume".
Marshall Altman - Programming, percussion, backing vocals, toy piano on "Who You Gonna Turn To", wurlitzer on "The Lime Tree" and "Volume", xylophone on "My Baba"

Technical
Marshall Altman - Producer, arrangement, recording
Eric Robinson - Mixing, recording
Brian Gardner - Mastering

Artwork
Kate Schafer - Cover shot
David Johnson - Photography
Carrie Smith - Art direction & design

References

2008 albums